Gritstone bio is a clinical-stage  American biotechnology company which develops cancer and infectious disease immunotherapies and vaccines.  It was founded in August 2015 as Gritstone Oncology, Inc., and is based in Emeryville, California.

In September 2021 it raised  $55.0 million from the sale of 5,000,000 shares.

It started a Phase 1 trial of its self-amplifying mRNA second generation SARS-CoV-2 vaccine, GRT-R910, in the NIHR Manchester Clinical Research Facility at Manchester Royal Infirmary, in September 2021.  This is to explore the ability of GRT-R910 to boost and expand the immunogenicity of AstraZeneca's first-generation COVID-19 vaccine AZD1222 (Vaxzevria) in healthy adults of more than 60 years.  It uses lipid nanoparticles to deliver a broad set of antigens against SARS-CoV-2 that includes both stabilized spike protein and highly conserved viral protein regions containing T cell epitopes. Prof. Andrew Ustianowski is the study’s chief investigator.

On 10 November 2021, Gritstone announced positive preclinical data of its second-generation self-amplifying mRNA (SAM) vaccine against SARS-CoV-2 in non-human primate models.

It is involved in a Phase 1/2 study, in collaboration with Bristol-Myers Squibb, in 26 patients with metastatic solid tumors.

References 

Biotechnology companies of the United States
Companies based in California
COVID-19 vaccine producers